TV Kumanovo  was a local terrestrial analog television channel in Kumanovo, North Macedonia.

See also
 Television in North Macedonia

External links
Article about TV Kumanovo in Utrinski Vesnik from 2006
Government funds for NRIO Nash Vesnik from 1999

References 

Television channels in North Macedonia
Mass media in Kumanovo